Heinrich Moritz Gaede, also Henri-Maurice Gaede (26 March 1795 – January 1834), was a German naturalist and entomologist.

He was a professor in Lüttich and at the University of Liège. 
Gaede wrote Beitrage zur Anatomie und Physiologie der Medusen, nebst einem Versuch einer Einleitung ueber das, was den altern Natursorschern in Hinsicht dieser Thiere bekannt war (1816) and Beytrage zur Anatomie der Insekten Altona, J. F. Hammerich (1815).

References
Tuxen, S. L. 1973 "Entomology Systematizes and describes 1700-1815". In Smith, R. F., Mittler, T. E. & Smith, C. N. (Ed.). History of Entomology. Palo Alto, Annual Reviews Inc. : 95-118.

1795 births
1834 deaths
German entomologists